is a passenger railway station in located in the city of Higashiōsaka,  Osaka Prefecture, Japan, operated by the private railway operator Kintetsu Railway.

Lines
Yaenosato Station is served by the Nara Line, and is located 2.4 rail kilometers from the starting point of the line at Fuse Station and 8.5 kilometers from Ōsaka Namba Station.

Station layout
The station consists of two elevated island platforms, with the station building underneath.

Platforms

Adjacent stations

History
Yaenosato Station opened on November 19, 1936 as a station of Osaka Electric Tramway. In 1941 it was transferred to the Kansai Kyūkō Railway, which became part of Kintetsu in 1944.

Passenger statistics
In fiscal 2018, the station was used by an average of 27,151 passengers daily.

Surrounding area
Municipal Higashi Osaka Medical Center 
Osaka Prefectural Nakagawachi Emergency and Critical Care Center
Higashi Osaka Labor Standards Inspection Office
Higashi Osaka City Waterworks Bureau

See also
List of railway stations in Japan

References

External links

 Yaenosato Station 

Railway stations in Osaka Prefecture
Railway stations in Japan opened in 1936
Higashiōsaka